Antipodean means belonging to the area diametrically opposite oneself on the Earth (the antipodes).

Antipodean may also refer to:

 A colloquial term for residents of Australasia, especially Australia and New Zealand
 Antipodeans, an Australian artist group in the 1950s
 The Antipodean, an annual Australian literary magazine in the 1890s